Sherrill Milnes (born January 10, 1935) is an American dramatic baritone most famous for his Verdi roles. From 1965 until 1997 he was associated with the Metropolitan Opera. His voice is a high dramatic baritone, combining good legato with an incisive rhythmic style. 

By 1965, aged 30, he had made his debut at the Metropolitan Opera. His international debuts followed soon thereafter, and Milnes became one of the world's prominent Verdi baritones of the 1970s and 1980s.

Early life

Milnes was born in Downers Grove, Illinois. His mother and father were dairy farmers. As a child, he exhibited strong and varied musical talents. In addition to singing, he also played piano, violin, viola, double bass, clarinet, and tuba. Although his interests did not always lean toward opera, he spent many hours singing to his father's cows and was once found on a tractor practicing an operatic laugh.

While in high school, Milnes planned to be an anesthesiologist, but later returned to music, studying music education at Drake University and Northwestern University, with the idea of becoming a teacher. He attended North Central College before transferring to Drake University and Northwestern University. 

From 1958 until 1963, he was a member of the Chicago Symphony Chorus under the direction of Margaret Hillis, performing several times under the baton of the Chicago Symphony Orchestra's sixth music director, Fritz Reiner. After graduating from Drake, he spent a summer as an apprentice at the Santa Fe Opera and thereafter dedicated himself to becoming an opera singer, studying briefly with the famed soprano Rosa Ponselle.

Milnes was awarded an honorary doctorate from North Central College in 2006.

Career

Milnes began his career with the Opera Company of Boston in 1960, joining Boris Goldovsky's Opera Theater, and debuting as Masetto in Don Giovanni. From very early on in his career, Milnes was managed by well-known talent manager Herbert Barrett. In 1961, he made his debut at Ponselle's Baltimore Opera as Gérard in Andrea Chénier.

In 1964, Milnes made his first major breakthrough singing the role of Valentin in Gounod's Faust at the New York City Opera (opposite Norman Treigle as Méphistophélès), the role with which he also made his Metropolitan Opera debut in 1965. In 1967 he created the role of Captain Adam Brant in the world premiere of Marvin David Levy's Mourning Becomes Electra at the Met.

In 1964, Milnes also made his European debut singing Figaro from The Barber of Seville at the Teatro Nuovo in Milan. However, it was his performance as Miller in Verdi's Luisa Miller in 1968 which catapulted him into international fame.
Milnes was the leading baritone at the Met  during the 1970s, singing to great acclaim there, especially for his performances in Verdi operas.

Beginning in 1982, Milnes experienced sudden serious vocal health problems which took him some time to surmount. In 1984, he sang in the world premiere of Act I of Sergei Rachmaninoff's opera Monna Vanna, which had been left in piano score by the composer and orchestrated by Igor Buketoff.

Milnes' talents were not confined, however, solely to the operatic stage. As early as 1971 he had already received critical acclaim while featured in the role of David during the premier of Ezra Laderman's opera And David Wept, on the CBS Television network, under the musical direction of Alfredo Antonini.  Nearly a decade earlier in 1964 he also collaborated with Antonini, playing the role of Saint Joseph in a televised adaptation of Hector Berlioz's sacred oratorio L'enfance du Christ.

Milnes was awarded Phi Mu Alpha Sinfonia fraternity's Charles E. Lutton Man of Music Award at its 1982 national convention in Urbana, Illinois. He had been initiated into the Fraternity's Alpha Beta chapter at Drake University in 1954. In the same year was honored by the Italian government as "Commendatore Ordine al Merito della Repubblica"

On July 5, 1986, he performed on the New York Philharmonic's tribute to the 100th anniversary of the Statue of Liberty, which was televised live by ABC.  The orchestra, conducted by Zubin Mehta, performed in Central Park.

In September 1996, Milnes was honored by the French government with the distinguished Chevalier de l'Ordre des Arts et des Lettres. After 32 years and 653 performances, he made his final appearance at the Metropolitan on March 22, 1997 as Amonasro in Aida.

In 1998, Milnes published a memoir, American Aria.

Milnes is currently a professor emeritus in voice at Northwestern University. He is a recipient of Yale University's Sanford Medal.

Milnes was inducted as a Laureate of The Lincoln Academy of Illinois and awarded the Order of Lincoln (the State’s highest honor) by the Governor of Illinois in 2003 in the area of The Performing Arts.

Milnes has been a resident of Cresskill, New Jersey, and currently resides in Palm Harbor, Florida with his wife and son, Theo.

VOICExperience Foundation
In 2001, Milnes and his wife, soprano Maria Zouves, founded the VOICExperience Foundation, a non-profit organization for the education of young singers.  It evolved from a series of master classes led by Milnes, Tony Randall, Martina Arroyo and Barry Tucker, president of the Richard Tucker Music Foundation. Based in Florida, it provides several educational programs, workshops, outreach events and community enrichment programs. In Florida, the foundation runs The Florida VOICE Project for singers in the Tampa Bay Area. In New York City, the foundation runs the Opera As Drama program, a week-long career development program for emerging professional opera singers which culminates in a public performance at Opera America's National Opera Center. As part of the Savannah Voice Festival, the foundation runs a Teen VOICE workshop and the Milnes VOICE studio.

Repertoire

Discography

Complete Operas and Other Works
1967
 Mozart: Così fan tutte (with L. Price, Troyanos, Raskin, Shirley, Flagello – Leinsdorf, cond.)
 Verdi: La traviata (with Caballé, Bergonzi – Prêtre, cond.)

1968
 R. Strauss: Salome (with Caballé, R. Lewis, Resnik, J. King – Leinsdorf, cond.)

1969
 Beethoven: Symphony No. 9, "Choral" (with J. Marsh, Veasey, Domingo – Leinsdorf, cond.)
 Orff: Carmina Burana (with Mandac, Kolk – Ozawa, cond.)
 Verdi: Il trovatore (with L. Price, Domingo, Cossotto – Mehta, cond.)

1970
 Verdi: Aïda (with L. Price, Domingo, Bumbry, Raimondi – Leinsdorf, cond.)
 Verdi: Macbeth (with Ludwig, Cossutta – Böhm, cond.) Live recording

1971
 Verdi: Un ballo in maschera (with Tebaldi, Pavarotti—Bartoletti, cond.)
 Puccini: Il tabarro (with L. Price, Domingo—Leinsdorf, cond.)
 Verdi: Don Carlos (with Domingo, Caballé, Raimondi, Verrett—Giulini, cond.)
 Donizetti: Lucia di Lammermoor (with Sutherland, Pavarotti, Ghiaurov—Bonynge, cond.)
 Leoncavallo: Pagliacci  (with Domingo, Caballe, Goeke-Santi, cond.) 
 Verdi: Rigoletto (with Sutherland, Pavarotti, Tourangeau, Talvela—Bonynge, cond.)

1972
 Verdi: Attila (with Raimondi, Deutekom, Bergonzi—Gardelli, cond.)
 Verdi: Giovanna d'Arco (with Caballé, Domingo—Levine, cond.)

1973
 Puccini: Tosca (with L. Price, Domingo – Mehta, cond.)

1974
 Puccini: La bohème (with Caballé, Domingo, Blegen, Sardinero, Raimondi – Solti, cond.)
 Verdi: I vespri siciliani (with Arroyo, Domingo, Raimondi – Levine, cond.)

1975
 Rossini: Il barbiere di Siviglia (with Sills, Gedda, Capecchi, Raimondi, Barbieri – Levine, cond.)
 Verdi: Luisa Miller (with Pavarotti, Caballé – Maag, cond.)
 Massenet's La Navarraise (with Horne, Domingo, Bacquier – H. Lewis, cond.)
 Verdi: Il trovatore [with bonus tracks from a 1968 recording of Act II with Richard Tucker] (with Caballé, Cossutta, Arkhipova – Guadagno, cond.)

1976
 Giordano: Andrea Chénier (with Scotto, Domingo – Levine, cond.)
 Verdi: Macbeth (with Cossotto, Carreras, Raimondi – Muti, cond.)
 Massenet: Thaïs (with Sills, Gedda, van Allan – Maazel, cond.)

1977
 Cilea: Adriana Lecouvreur (with Scotto, Domingo, Obraztsova – Levine, cond.)
 Bizet: Carmen (with Berganza, Domingo, Cotrubas – C. Abbado, cond.)
 Puccini: La fanciulla del West (with Neblett, Domingo – Mehta, cond.)
 Verdi: La forza del destino (with L. Price, Domingo, Cossotto, Giaiotti, Bacquier – Levine, cond.)
 Verdi: La traviata (with Cotrubas, Domingo – Kleiber, cond.)
 Walton: Belshazzar's Feast (Gibson, cond.)

1978
 Rossini: Guglielmo Tell (with Freni, Pavarotti, Mazzoli, Jones, Ghiaurov – Chailly, cond.)
 Verdi: Otello (with Domingo, Scotto – Levine, cond.)
 Verdi: Rigoletto (with Sills, Kraus, M. Dunn, Ramey – Rudel, cond.)
 Puccini: Tosca (with Freni, Pavarotti – Rescigno, cond.)

1979
 Puccini: La bohème (with Scotto, Neblett, Kraus, Manuguerra, Plishka, Tajo; Levine, cond.)

1980
 Massenet: Le roi de Lahore (with Sutherland, Lima, Ghiaurov, Morris, Tourangeau – Bonynge, cond.)

1981
 Ponchielli: La Gioconda (with Caballé, Baltsa, Pavarotti, Ghiaurov – Bartoletti, cond.)

1983
 Thomas:  Hamlet  (with Sutherland, Morris, Conrad, Winbergh, Lewis, Gelling; Bonynge, cond.)

1986
 Ponchielli: La Gioconda (with Marton, Ramey, Lamberti – Patanè, cond.

1990
 Fauré: Requiem (with Te Kanawa – Dutoit, cond.)

2001
 Wolf-Ferrari: Sly (with Carreras, Kabatu – Gimenez, cond.)

Recitals
 Sherrill Milnes in Recital, Volume 1, "There but for You Go I" (Jon Spong, piano)
 Sherrill Milnes in Recital, Volume 2, "Kingdom by the Sea" (Jon Spong, piano)
 Met Legends: Sherrill Milnes
 Grandi Voci: Arias (de la Fuente, cond.)
 The Baritone Voice
 Great Operatic Duets (with Domingo)
 Domingo Conducts Milnes! - Milnes Conducts Domingo! (with Domingo)
 Sherrill Milnes - Arias 
 Abide With Me
 The Church's One Foundation
 The America I Love
 Copland: Old American Songs
 Up In Central Park (with B. Sills, Rudel, cond.)
 Griffes: Four German Songs; Songs of the Dagger (Ozawa, cond.)
 A Salute to American Music (with L. Price, M. Horne,R. Merrill, et.al, Conlon, cond.)

DVDs
1976
 Puccini: Tosca (with Kabaivanska, Domingo – Bartoletti, cond., de Bosio, dir.)

1979
 Verdi: Luisa Miller (with Scotto, Domingo, Morris; Levine, cond., Merrill, dir.)

1980
 Verdi: Don Carlos (Scotto, Troyanos, Moldoveanu, Plishka, Hines; Levine, cond., Dexter, dir.)

1983
 Verdi: Ernani (with L. Mitchell, Pavarotti, Raimondi – Levine, cond., Samaritani, dir.)

1984
 Verdi: Simon Boccanegra (with Tomowa-Sintow, Moldoveanu, Plishka – Levine, cond., Capobianco, dir.)

1985
 Verdi: Nabucco (with Bumbry, Cortez, Raimondi – Santi, cond.)
 Sherrill Milnes: An All-Star Gala (various artists)

1986
 Sherrill Milnes at Juilliard: An Opera Master Class

1988
 Verdi: Il trovatore (with Marton, Zajick, Pavarotti – Levine, cond., Melano, dir.)

1989
 Verdi: Aïda (with Millo, Zajick, Domingo – Levine, cond., Frisell, dir.)

1991
 The Metropolitan Opera Gala 1991 - 25th Anniversary at Lincoln Center (various artists)

1992
 Puccini: La fanciulla del West (with Daniels, Domingo – Slatkin, cond., del Monaco, dir.)

1996
 James Levine's 25th Anniversary Metropolitan Opera Gala (various artists)

References
Biographical information from the biography on

External links
 Bio and discography
 Official V.O.I.C. Experience Website
 Northwestern University Notable Alumni Website
 Two Interviews with Sherrill Milnes by Bruce Duffie, October 9, 1985 & February 9, 1993

1935 births
American operatic baritones
Chevaliers of the Ordre des Arts et des Lettres
Drake University alumni
Northwestern University faculty
Living people
Bienen School of Music alumni
People from Cresskill, New Jersey
People from Downers Grove, Illinois
20th-century American male opera singers
Singers from Illinois
Classical musicians from Illinois
Singers from New Jersey
Classical musicians from New Jersey